Gasterocercus anatinus is a species of beetle belonging to the  true weevil family.

References 

 Catalogue of life
 Universal Biological Indexer

anatinus
Molytinae
Beetles described in 1880